Cacho Espíndola (1940 – August 21, 2004) was an Argentine actor. He starred in the 1962 film Una Jaula no tiene secretos.

Partial filmography

Héroes de hoy (1960)
Alias Gardelito (1961)
Una jaula no tiene secretos (1962)
Dar la cara (1962)
La chacota (1962)
Sombras en el cielo (1964)
Chronicle of a Boy Alone (1965) - Physical Training
Hotel alojamiento (1966)
Las locas del conventillo (1966)
Buenos Aires, verano 1912 (1966)
Cuando los hombres hablan de mujeres (1967)
Invasión (1969) - Dueño de motoneta (uncredited)
Juan Lamaglia y señora (1970)
Los mochileros (1970)
La cosecha (1970)
Balada para un mochilero (1971)
Un guapo del 900 (1971)
La gran ruta (1971) - Bebe
Mi novia el... (1975) - Lince
Los Chantas (1975) - Bicicleta
Una mujer (1975)
La película (1975)
Juan que Ria (1976)
Donde duermen dos... duermen tres (1979)
So Feared a Hell (1980)
La pulga en la oreja (1981)
Noches sin lunas ni soles (1984) - Gato Félix
Tacos altos (1985) - Julián
Las lobas (1986)
Johnny Tolengo, el majestuoso (1987)
El amateur (1999) - Intendente
Tobi y el libro mágico (2001) - El abuelo
El fondo del mar (2003) - police officer (voice)
India pravile (2003) - (final film role)

References

External links
 
 

Argentine male film actors
1940 births
2004 deaths